Palmerston North Girls' High School is a secondary school for girls, located in the suburb of West End in the city of Palmerston North, New Zealand.

Location
The main entrance of the school is located on Fitzherbert Avenue, near the Victoria Esplanade. Adjacent to the north are Huia Street and tennis courts. Behind the school is Manawaroa/Ongley Park.

History
In 1902, Palmerston North High School was a co-ed secondary school created with an initial roll of 84 students (40 boys and 44 girls).  The first classes were held at St Andrews Presbyterian Church Sunday School hall.

In 1912, Palmerston North High School was split into two single-sex schools: Palmerston North Girls’ High School and Palmerston North Boys’ High School.

School houses
Palmerston North Girls' High School is divided into four houses. On enrolment, students are placed in a house at random, or into a house with family ties if possible. Staff are also placed in the houses. Each house is named after a former principal of the school.

The house names and colours are as follows:

The student councils organise events, many of which contribute to the inter-house competition and points towards the award of the Nash Cup.

Demographics
At the September 2010 Education Review Office (ERO) review, Palmerston North Girls' High School had 1202 students enrolled, including 22 international students. 64 percent of students identified as New Zealand European (Pākehā), 17 percent identified as Māori, three percent as Pacific Islanders, and 16 percent as another ethnicity.

Palmerston North Girls' High School has a socio-economic decile of 8 (step P), meaning it draws its school community from areas of moderate to high socioeconomic advantage when compared to other New Zealand schools. This changed from decile 9 (step Q) at the beginning of 2015, as part of the nationwide review of deciles following the 2013 census.

Notable alumnae

 Rita Angus - painter
 Hannah Rowe - New Zealand White Fern (cricket)
 Georgia Barnett - 2015 Manawatu Sportswoman of the Year and Women's Black Sticks (hockey) 
 Hannah Broederlow - New Zealand netball player
 Jessica Clarke - New Zealand model
 Joy Cowley - writer
 Rebecca Hull - New Zealand Women's rugby union player
 Anna Leese - opera singer
 Liana Leota - New Zealand netball player
 Emily Naylor - New Zealand Women's Black Sticks (hockey)
 Kayla Sharland - New Zealand Women's Black Sticks (hockey)

References

External links

Educational institutions established in 1912
Girls' schools in New Zealand
Schools in Palmerston North
Secondary schools in Manawatū-Whanganui
1912 establishments in New Zealand
Alliance of Girls' Schools Australasia